Fritillaria raddeana is a perennial herbaceous bulbous plant, distributed in Iran, Turkmenistan and Kashmir. It is a species in the genus Fritillaria, in the lily family Liliaceae. It is placed in the subgenus Petilium. Resembling Fritillaria imperialis (crown imperial), but shorter, it is sometimes referred to as the dwarf crown imperial.

Description 
The inflorescence forms an umbel of 10–20 pendant bell-shaped flowers with six tepals that are yellowish to green. Nectaries 2–3  mm in diameter. Stem of about 2 1/2' feet (50–80 cm) in height. The umbel is topped with a pineapple-like tuft of narrow leaf-like bracts. On the stem are shiny, glaucous, lanceolate, pale green alternate leaves, up to 5 " in length. The plant has a disagreeable odor. The chromosome number is 2n = 24

Taxonomy 
In 1874 Baker had subdivided genus Fritillaria into ten subgenera. In subgenus Petilium he included a single species, F. imperialis. In 1887 Regel added a second species, F. raddeana. He named the species after Gustav Ferdinand Richard Radde (1831-1903).

Distribution and habitat 
F. raddeana is found in rocky areas in Iran, Turkmenistan and Kashmir at altitudes of  900–1800 meters, but is also seen in lowlands.

Cultivation 
Fritillaria raddeana is hardy to USDA zones 5–8., and blooms from April to May, in full sun to part shade.

References

Bibliography

External links 

raddeana